HD 89744 b is an eccentric Jupiter extrasolar planet orbiting the star HD 89744.

In a simulation of a 10 million year span, this planet swept away all test particles "except for a narrow region near the 8:3 resonance". There can be no planets in this star's habitable zone. Observation has ruled out any planet over 0.7 Jupiter mass within a year period.

References

External links
 

Exoplanets discovered in 2000
Giant planets
Ursa Major (constellation)
Exoplanets detected by radial velocity

es:HD 89744#Sistema planetario